In mathematics, in the area of additive number theory, the Erdős–Fuchs theorem is a statement about the number of ways that numbers can be represented as a sum of elements of a given additive basis, stating that the average order of this number cannot be too close to being a linear function.

The theorem is named after Paul Erdős and Wolfgang Heinrich Johannes Fuchs, who published it in 1956.

Statement
We then consider the accumulated representation function

The theorem then states that, for any given , the relation

cannot be satisfied; that is, there is no  satisfying the above estimate.

Theorems of Erdős–Fuchs type 
The Erdős–Fuchs theorem has an interesting history of precedents and generalizations. In 1915, it was already known by G. H. Hardy that in the case of the sequence  of perfect squares one has

This estimate is a little better than that described by Erdős–Fuchs, but at the cost of a slight loss of precision, P. Erdős and W. H. J. Fuchs achieved complete generality in their result (at least for the case ). Another reason this result is so celebrated may be due to the fact that, in 1941, P. Erdős and P. Turán conjectured that, subject to the same hypotheses as in the theorem stated, the relation

could not hold. This fact remained unproven until 1956, when Erdős and Fuchs obtained their theorem, which is even stronger than the previously conjectured estimate.

Improved versions for h = 2 
This theorem has been extended in a number of different directions. In 1980, A. Sárközy considered two sequences which are "near" in some sense. He proved the following:

 Theorem (Sárközy, 1980).

In 1990, H. L. Montgomery and R. C. Vaughan were able to remove the log from the right-hand side of Erdős–Fuchs original statement, showing that

cannot hold. In 2004, Gábor Horváth extended both these results, proving the following:

 Theorem (Horváth, 2004).

General case (h ≥ 2) 
In fact, M. Tang showed in 2009 that, in the same conditions as in the original statement of Erdős–Fuchs, for every  the relation

cannot hold. In another direction, in 2002, Gábor Horváth gave a precise generalization of Sárközy's 1980 result, showing that

<li>
<li> (for )
then the relation:

cannot hold for any constant .

Non-linear approximations 
In 1963, Paul T. Bateman, Eugene E. Kohlbecker and Jack P. Tull proved a slightly stronger version of the following:
 Theorem (Bateman–Kohlbecker–Tull, 1963). Let  be a slowly varying function which is either convex or concave from some point onward. Then, on the same conditions as in the original Erdős–Fuchs theorem, we cannot have , where  if  is bounded, and  otherwise.

See also
 Erdős–Tetali theorem: For any , there is a set  which satisfies . (Existence of economical bases)
 Erdős–Turán conjecture on additive bases: If  is an additive basis of order 2, then . (Bases cannot be too economical)

References

Further reading
 
 

Theorems in combinatorics
Theorems in number theory
Fuchs theorem